The 1976 Limerick Senior Hurling Championship was the 82nd staging of the Limerick Senior Hurling Championship since its establishment by the Limerick County Board.

Kilmallock were the defending champions.

South Liberties won the championship after a 2-09 to 2-06 defeat of Killeedy in the final. It was their fifth championship title overall and their first title in four years.

References

Limerick Senior Hurling Championship
Limerick Senior Hurling Championship